Pancho Villa was famous during the Mexican Revolution and has remained so, holding a fairly mythical reputation in Mexican consciousness, but not officially recognized in Mexico until long after his death. As the "Centaur from the North" he was considered a threat to property and order on both sides of the border, feared, and revered, as a modern Robin Hood.

Pancho Villa remains a controversial figure in the United States. USA Today reported, "A terrorist in 1916, a tourist attraction in 2011. ... On Jan. 8, 1916, 18 U.S. businessmen were massacred by Villa's men in a train robbery in northern Mexico. It was not the first or last of Villa's atrocities; he personally shot a priest who begged for clemency for his villagers, as well as a woman who blamed him for her husband's death."

In films, video, and television

Villa appeared as himself in the films Life of Villa (1912), Barbarous Mexico (1913), With General Pancho Villa in Mexico (1913), The Life of General Villa (1914) and Following the Flag in Mexico (1916).

Films based on Pancho Villa have appeared since the early years of the Revolution and have continued to be made into the twenty-first century. Hollywood's role in the shaping of the image of Villa, the Mexican Revolution, and U.S. public opinion has been the subject of a scholarly study. The 1934 biopic Viva Villa! was nominated for an Academy Award for Best Picture. In 2003, HBO  broadcast And Starring Pancho Villa as Himself, with Antonio Banderas as Villa that focuses on the making of the film The Life of General Villa.

Actors who have portrayed Villa include:

 Raoul Walsh (1912, 1914) The Life of General Villa
 Wallace Beery (1917) Patria
 George Humbert (1918) Why America Will Win
 Wallace Beery (1934) Viva Villa!, with Phillip Cooper (Pancho Villa as a boy)
 Juan F. Triana (1935) El Tesoro de Pancho Villa
 Domingo Soler (1936) Vámonos con Pancho Villa
 Maurice Black (1937) Under Strange Flags
 Leo Carrillo (1949) Pancho Villa Returns
 Pedro Armendáriz (1950, 1957, 1960 twice)
 Alan Reed (1952) Viva Zapata!
 Victor Alcocer (1955) El siete leguas
 Rodolfo Hoyos Jr. (1958) Villa!!
 Rafael Campos (1959) Have Gun - Will Travel; Season 3, Episode 6 (Pancho)
 José Elías Moreno (1967) El Centauro Pancho Villa
 Ricardo Palacios (1967) Los siete de Pancho Villa
 Yul Brynner (1968) Villa Rides
 Telly Savalas (1972) Pancho Villa
 Heraclio Zepeda (1973) Reed, México insurgente
 Antonio Aguilar (1974) La Muerte de Pancho Villa
 Héctor Elizondo (1976) Wanted: The Sundance Woman (TV)
 Freddy Fender (1977) She Came to the Valley
 José Villamor (1980) Viva México (TV)
 Jorge Reynoso (1982) Red Bells: Mexico in Flames
 Gaithor Brownne (1985) Blood Church
 Guillermo Gil (1987) Senda de Gloria (TV series)
 Pedro Armendáriz Jr. (1989) Old Gringo
 Mike Moroff (1992) The Young Indiana Jones Chronicles, Young Indiana Jones and the Curse of the Jackal, "Mexico, March 1916", The Adventures of Young Indiana Jones: Spring Break Adventure
 Antonio Aguilar (1993) La sangre de un valiente
 Alonso Echánove (1993) By Our Own Correspondent
 Jesús Ochoa (1995) Entre Pancho Villa y una mujer desnuda
 Carlos Roberto Majul (1999) Ah! Silenciosa
 Peter Butler (2000) From Dusk Till Dawn 3: The Hangman's Daughter
 Antonio Banderas (2003) And Starring Pancho Villa as Himself (HBO)
 Alejandro Calva (2009) Chico Grande

More films about Villa:
 Pancho Villa's Shadow (1933) by Miguel Contreras Torres
 Deadliest Warrior, Spike TV's hit show, featured Pancho Villa in a match-up against Chief Crazy Horse (2011)
 Wild Roses, Tender Roses (2012), based on the novel The Friends of Pancho Villa, by James Carlos Blake

In literature
 In Mariano Azuela's novel The Underdogs, anti-federal soldiers talk about him as an archetype of an anti-authoritarian bandit: "Villa, indomitable lord of the sierra, the eternal victim of all governments... Villa tracked, hunted down like a wild beast... Villa the reincarnation of the old legend; Villa as Providence, the bandit, that passes through the world armed with the blazing torch of an ideal: to rob the rich and give to the poor. It was the poor who built up and imposed a legend about him which Time itself was to increase and embellish as a shining example from generation to generation." However, a little later, one character distrusts the rumors: "Anastasio Montañéz questioned the speaker more particularly. It was not long before he realized that all this high praise was hearsay and that not a single man in Natera's army had ever laid eyes on Villa."
 Whatever the reality behind the legends, even after his defeat Villa remained a powerful character still lurking in the Mexican mind. In 1950 Octavio Paz wrote, in his morose but thoughtful book on the Mexican soul The Labyrinth of Solitude, "The brutality and uncouthness of many of the revolutionary leaders has not prevented them from becoming popular myths. Villa still gallops through the north, in songs and ballads; Zapata dies at every popular fair... It is the Revolution, the magical word, the word that is going to change everything, that is going to bring us immense delight and a quick death."
 El águila y la serpiente by Martín Luis Guzmán (1930); it "can be considered as [Guzmán's] reminiscences of Villa and his movement.
 The Gringo Bandit (1947), by William Hopson.
 The Friends of Pancho Villa (1996), by James Carlos Blake.
 In the Southern Victory Series novels The Great War: American Front and The Great War: Walk in Hell by Harry Turtledove, Doroteo Arango is a candidate for the Radical Liberal Party in the 1915 Confederate States Presidential Election, representing Chihuahua, which the CSA purchased in 1881 and retained following the Second Mexican War fought between the CSA and the United States. He went on to be soundly defeated in the election to the Whig candidate and incumbent Vice President, Gabriel Semmes.
 In the alternate history short story "Compadres" by S.M. Stirling collected in the anthology Alternate Generals II (2002) edited by Harry Turtledove, The American territory of annexation following the end of the Mexican-American War in 1848 included Chihuahua. Decades later, Pancho Villa would become a Senator of the State of Chihuahua and is later the running mate of Theodore Roosevelt in the 1904 presidential election.

In music
 "Pancho Villa", song by Billy Walker
 "Pancho Villa From a Safe Distance", opera by Graham Reynolds
 "Pancho and Lefty", a song by Townes Van Zandt about a fictional bandit named Pancho, loosely based on Pancho Villa
 "Ride With Me Gringo", song by Riders In The Sky

References

Cultural depictions of Pancho Villa